The Variations in E-flat major piano trio, Op. 44, by Ludwig van Beethoven, is a series of fourteen variations on a theme, written for piano, violin and cello. Although this may be one of Beethoven's early works (written circa 1792, i.e., at around age 22) it was assigned its opus number when it was published by Hoffmeister in Leipzig, more than a decade after Beethoven began writing it.

The opera reached Bonn in 1792, during the last months that Beethoven stayed there. This line is from an aria sung by the village mayor Hans Christoph Nitsche, who is announces that he must leave his wife. Beethoven's variations were probably finished when he left Bonn – a short sketch from 1792 has survived – but were published as Op. 44 in 1804.

The theme is a series of simple unadorned arpeggios in octave unisons by all three players. Beethoven then develops fourteen variations, decorative in the tradition of the eighteenth century but with contrasting spirit and textures employed. The tenth variation, syncopated and vigorous, is followed by an almost exaggeratedly reserved dialogue while the twelfth variation's gentle ambling is interrupted by a burst of coarse fortissimo. This work includes two slow variations in E-flat minor (Nos 7 and 13). The final variation begins allegro in 6/8, dynamic and joyful, interrupted by a brief interlude marked andante. The conclusion is marked presto, led by the piano.

The playing time of these variations is usually 13 to 14 minutes.

Recordings
 Beaux Arts Trio, 1965 (Philips)
 Daniel Barenboim piano, Pinchas Zukerman violin, Jacqueline du Pré cello, 1969 (EMI Classics)
 Wilhelm Kempff piano, Henryk Szeryng violin, Pierre Fournier cello, 1969 (Deutsche Grammophon)

 Isaac Stern, Leonard Rose, Eugene Istomin, 1970 (Columbia Records)
 Borodin Trio, 1984 Chandos
 Vladimir Ashkenazy piano, Itzhak Perlman violin, Lynn Harrell cello, 1986 (EMI Classics)
 Guarneri Trio Prague, 1999 (Harmonia Mundi) 
 The Florestan Trio, 2004 (Hyperion Records)
 Trio Wanderer, 2012 (Harmonia Mundi)

Notes

External links

Piano trios by Ludwig van Beethoven
Variations
1804 compositions
Compositions in E-flat major